Group C may refer to:

 Group C, a category of motorsport, introduced by the FIA in 1982 for sports car racing
 Group C (Australia), to either of two sets of regulations for use in Australian touring car racing from 1965 to 1984
 Group C (Nubia), archaeological culture in Nubia (Sudan)
 One of six or eight groups of four teams competing at the FIFA World Cup
 2022 FIFA World Cup Group C
 2018 FIFA World Cup Group C
 2014 FIFA World Cup Group C
 2010 FIFA World Cup Group C
 2006 FIFA World Cup Group C
 2002 FIFA World Cup Group C
 1998 FIFA World Cup Group C
 1994 FIFA World Cup Group C
 1990 FIFA World Cup Group C

See also

 C group (disambiguation)
 Group 3 (disambiguation)
 Group (disambiguation)
 C (disambiguation)